Maziar Zare Eshghdoost (born 22 December 1984 in Bandar Anzali, Iran) is an Iranian former football player and current coach. He was a right-footed defensive midfielder.

He is dubbed as The New Ghayeghran after the late Sirous Ghayeghran, Malavan's legend and also wore the coveted number 9 shirt.

Club career
He Played 4 seasons for Malavan and moved to Persepolis in the summer of 2008 and played in AFC Champions League for the team and was the regular player for the team which he took the penalties. After a disappointing season in UAE he returned to Persepolis in 2010 and won the Hazfi Cup in the first season. He was one of the regular players of the team during the second season but was mostly substituted towards the end of the season when Mustafa Denizli was the coach. In June 2012, he moved back to Malavan along with former teammate Pejman Nouri.

Club career statistics
Last Update:  26 September 2015 

 Assist Goals

International career

Maziar Zare was a member of Iran national under-23 football team in the 2006 Asian Games, where he scored a 30-yard strike for Iran. He was called up to the senior squad in June 2007 for the West Asian Football Federation Championship 2007. He made his debut for Iran in a match vs Iraq. He played in the 2010 FIFA World Cup qualification and 2011 AFC Asian Cup qualification for Team Melli.

He also was invited in June 2011 by Carlos Queiroz to participate in the 2014 FIFA World Cup qualification.

International goals
Scores and results list Iran's goal tally first.

Managerial statistics

Honours

Player
Persepolis
Hazfi Cup (1): 2010–11

Manager
Malavan
Azadegan League champion (1): 2021–22

References

Iran Premier League Stats

External links
 Maziar Zare at PersianLeague.com
 Maziar Zare at TeamMelli.com
 Maziar Zare's Profile in 18ghadam.ir
 

1984 births
Living people
Iranian footballers
Iranian expatriate footballers
Association football midfielders
Persian Gulf Pro League players
UAE Pro League players
Malavan players
Persepolis F.C. players
Expatriate footballers in the United Arab Emirates
People from Bandar-e Anzali
Iran international footballers
Asian Games bronze medalists for Iran
Asian Games medalists in football
Footballers at the 2006 Asian Games
Medalists at the 2006 Asian Games
Sportspeople from Gilan province
Malavan F.C. managers